Hypnotist or The Hypnotist may refer to:

 Hypnotist, a person who practices hypnosis
 The Hypnotist, the alternative title of the 1927 American film London After Midnight
 The Hypnotist, the American home video title for the 1999 Japanese film Saimin
 "The Hypnotist", a song by Erra from their 2016 album Drift
 The Hypnotist (1940 film), a 1940 Mexican comedy mystery film
 The Hypnotist (1957 film), a British thriller film
 The Hypnotist (2012 film), a 2012 Swedish film
 The Hypnotist (novel), a crime novel published under the name Lars Kepler